The 1925 Milan–San Remo was the 18th edition of the Milan–San Remo cycle race and was held on 29 March 1925. The race started in Milan and finished in San Remo. The race was won by Costante Girardengo.

General classification

References

1925
1925 in road cycling
1925 in Italian sport
March 1925 sports events